King Peter may refer to: 

Noble / Religious hierarchs:
 Peter I (disambiguation), multiple people
 Peter II (disambiguation), multiple people
 Peter III (disambiguation), multiple people
 Peter IV (disambiguation), multiple people
 Peter V (disambiguation), multiple people
 Peter VII (disambiguation), multiple people
 Peter VII of Alexandria (disambiguation)

 Zolu Duma aka 'King Peter'; Gola tribal leader in land that became Liberia.

Fictional characters:
 Peter Pevensie